Iden is a municipality in the district of Stendal, in Saxony-Anhalt, Germany. In July 2009 it absorbed the former municipality Sandauerholz.

References

Municipalities in Saxony-Anhalt
Stendal (district)